Trichis is a genus of beetles in the family Carabidae, containing the following species:

 Trichis ceylonica (Ball & Hilchie, 1983)
 Trichis iranica Mandl, 1973
 Trichis maculata Klug, 1832
 Trichis pallida Klug, 1832
 Trichis petrovitzi Mandl, 1973

References

Lebiinae